The 2018 Leeds City Council election took place on Thursday 3 May 2018 to elect members of Leeds City Council in England. It was held on the same day as other  UK local elections across England.

Following a full boundary review of Leeds' 33 electoral wards by the Local Government Boundary Commission, the all-out election saw all of the council's 99 available council seats contested based on the new ward boundaries. Three of the previous wards were abolished and replaced (City & Hunslet, Headingley, and Hyde Park & Woodhouse for Headingley & Hyde Park, Hunslet & Riverside and Little London & Woodhouse). The last all-out election in Leeds was in 2004 after the previous full ward boundary review in 2003.

With three seats available for each ward, electors were able to cast up to three votes for three different candidates. The first three candidates past the post in each ward won a council seat.

The Labour Party won the election with 61 of the 99 council seats.

Election summary

|- style="text-align: right; font-weight: bold;"
! scope="row" colspan="2" | Total
| 335
| 99
| 12
| 12
| 0
| 100.0
| 100.0
| 539,003
| 354,327

This result had the following consequences for the total number of seats on the council after the elections:

Councillors who did not stand for re-election 

Incumbent Morley Borough Independent councillor, Robert Finnigan, did not stand in the ward he represented, Morley North. Instead, he stood in the neighbouring ward of Morley South Ward. However, Finnigan was subsequently not elected at the election for the ward.

Ward results
Three councillors were elected for each of the wards.

An asterisk (*) denotes an incumbent councillor who stood again at the election, having 21 sitting councillors not stood again for their seats.

The percentage vote share (%) is calculated by counting only the highest-scoring candidate for each party and individual independent candidates. For example, the total number of votes cast by electors in the Adel & Wharfedale ward for Barry Anderson (the highest-scoring Conservative candidate), Nigel Gill (Labour), Peter Jackson (Liberal Democrat) and Liddy Swales (sole Green candidate) was 7,980. As Anderson gained 4,856 votes, he took 61.5% of the 7,980 total possible ballots cast, whilst Gill gained 1,556 votes and 19.7% of the total votes cast.

The percentage change (±) is the proportion by which the individual party and/or candidate's vote share increased or decreased from the previous council election in 2016.

The turnout is the amount of registered electors who voted in the ward at the time of the election. The turnout percentage (%) is the proportion of registered electors in the ward who voted on the day of the election.

Adel & Wharfedale

Alwoodley

Ardsley & Robin Hood
Labour councillor Ben Garner replaced independent Councillor Jack Dunn, who had resigned the Labour Whip and left the Labour Group on the council in January 2018.

Armley

Beeston & Holbeck

Bramley & Stanningley

Burmantofts & Richmond Hill

Calverley & Farsley
Former Joint Leader of the Council and long-standing Leader of the Conservative Group, Andrew Carter CBE, and his wife, Amanda Carter, were re-elected. Their fellow incumbent, Rod Wood, lost out to Peter Carlill of Labour by 47 votes.

Chapel Allerton
All three incumbent Labour councillors were re-elected, including incumbent Lord Mayor of Leeds Jane Dowson.

Cross Gates & Whinmoor
Jessica Lennox (Labour) defeated independent Janette Walker. Walker had been a Labour councillor since her first election in 2012 and left the Labour Group on the council in early 2017 to run as an independent.

Farnley & Wortley

Garforth & Swillington
Both Independent incumbents, Mark Dobson and Sarah Field, were elected to the council alongside fellow independent, Suzanne McCormack, who replaced retiring Labour Councillor Stuart McKenna. Both Dobson and Field had been elected as Labour Councillors but resigned from the Labour Council Group in February 2017 to stand as independents.

Gipton & Harehills

Guiseley & Rawdon
All three incumbent Conservative councillors were re-elected, including Lord Mayor of Leeds-elect Graham Latty.

Harewood
The two Conservatives re-standing for election were successful, with fellow Conservative Councillor Rachael Procter, who was deselected, replaced by Samuel Firth.

Headingley & Hyde Park
The three incumbent Labour councillors for Headingley ward stood and won the three council seats to represent the new and enlargened ward of Headingley & Hyde Park.

Horsforth

Hunslet & Riverside
The two incumbent Labour councillors of the previous City & Hunslet ward were re-elected for the new ward alongside Paul Wray. Wray replaced the deselected City & Hunslet Councillor Patrick Davey as the third Labour candidate.

Killingbeck & Seacroft
Three new Labour councillors were elected, defeating the incumbent independent Councillor Catherine Dobson. Elected originally as a Labour councillor, Dobson resigned from the Labour Group in October 2017. The two remaining Labour incumbents, Graham Hyde and Brian Selby, retired at the election and did not restand.

Kippax & Methley
The three incumbent Labour councillors were re-elected, including the current Joint Deputy Leader of the Council, James Lewis, and former Leader of the Council, Keith Wakefield.

Kirkstall
New Labour candidate Hannah Bithell topped the poll, elected alongside incumbent Councillors Fiona Venner and John Illingworth. Bithell replaced the retiring Joint Deputy Leader of the Council, Lucinda Yeadon, as the third Labour candidate.

Little London & Woodhouse
Labour Councillor for Hyde Park & Woodhouse Christine Towler retired whilst her two ward colleagues, Javaid Akhtar and Gerry Harper, stood successfully for the new ward of Little London & Woodhouse, following boundary changes. They were joined by new Labour candidate Kayleigh Brooks.

Middleton Park

Moortown
The two Labour councillors re-standing for election were successful. Mohammed Shahzad replaced retiring Councillor Alex Sobel (also MP for Leeds North West) as the third Labour candidate.

Morley North
The Morley Borough Independents won all three available council seats again, with new candidate Andy Hutchinson replacing Robert Finnigan. Finnigan, also the Leader of the MBI Group on the council, chose to stand for Morley South ward instead.

Morley South

Otley & Yeadon

Pudsey
The Conservatives gained two seats whilst Labour Councillor Richard Lewis was re-elected by 75 votes over the third Conservative candidate. Labour Councillor Mick Coulson was the only incumbent to lose their bid for re-election as his fellow Labour colleague Josephine Jarosz retired.

Rothwell

Roundhay

Temple Newsam
All three Labour incumbent councillors won re-election. After the election, Debra Coupar replaced former Kirkstall ward councillor, Lucinda Yeadon, as Joint Deputy Leader of the Council.

Weetwood

Wetherby

New Conservative candidate and Mayor of Wetherby Norma Harrington topped the poll, elected with the two Conservative incumbents who were re-standing for election. Harrington was chosen as the third Conservative candidate instead of current Councillor John Procter (also MEP for Yorkshire and the Humber).

Notes

References 

2018
2018 English local elections
2010s in Leeds